Brandie Jay Dorminey (born November 26, 1993) is a retired American elite artistic gymnast. She won two gold medals at the 2011 Pan American Games with the team and on vault.

Jay attended the University of Georgia and competed for their NCAA team. During her senior year at Georgia she won the NCAA national title on vault.

Competitive history

References

1993 births
Living people
American female artistic gymnasts
Sportspeople from Fort Collins, Colorado
People from Athens, Georgia
Pan American Games gold medalists for the United States
Pan American Games medalists in gymnastics
U.S. women's national team gymnasts
Gymnasts at the 2011 Pan American Games
Medalists at the 2011 Pan American Games
21st-century American women
Georgia Gym Dogs gymnasts